Vermont Academy (VA) is a private, co-educational, college preparatory, boarding and day school in Saxtons River, Vermont, serving students from ninth through twelfth grade, as well as postgraduates. Founded in 1876, the campus was listed on the National Register of Historic Places as the Vermont Academy Campus Historic District in 2015.

History
According to Lyman Simpson Hayes in his 1907 History of the Town of Rockingham, Vermont the resolution to establish Vermont Academy in Saxtons River was made at the annual meeting of the Vermont Baptist State convention in Windsor, Vermont on November 10, 1869.

The following resolution was adopted: "Resolved: That the time has come when the Baptists of Vermont should awake to an increased interest in the subject of general education, and should express that interest by taking immediate steps to secure the establishment and adequate endowment of a first-class Literary and Scientific Institute for the education of our youth of both sexes.″

In order to incorporate the academy in 1872, it was proposed to raise by subscription an endowment fund of $100,000. The largest subscription (of $20,000) came from a native of Saxtons River, Charles L. Jones, who was at that time living in Cambridge, MA. In due course, the first building on Vermont Academy's campus was named after him: Jones Hall, which still stands today.

Founded in 1876 by William M. Pingry, Vermont Academy originally included a boys-only lower school, which gave "...special attention to life in the open."

In 1934, Ernest Martin Hopkins, President of Dartmouth College, recommended Laurence G. Leavitt, a fellow Dartmouth graduate, for the job of Head of School of Vermont Academy. Leavitt was headmaster for twenty-five years, during which he doubled enrollment, eliminated school debt, and made improvements to the campus.

Over the course of the COVID-19 pandemic, Vermont Academy received more than two million dollars in PPP loans

Traditions

The Vermont Academy Evening Song

Academics
The Vermont Academy curriculum includes courses in Art, College Counseling, English, History, Learning Skills, Mathematics, Music, Science, and World Language (French, Latin, or Spanish). Additionally, VA is a partner with Liceo Europeo, a private school in Madrid.

Athletics

Home of the Wildcats, Vermont Academy athletics compete in the New England Preparatory School Athletic Council and are a member of the Lakes Region League. The school offers a wide range of sports, categorized by Fall, Spring, and Winter. Fall athletics include: crew, cross country, equestrian, mountain biking, soccer, and wilderness skills. Spring athletics include: baseball, equestrian, fly fishing, golf, lacrosse, rock climbing, and tennis. Winter athletics include: alpine, basketball, dance, freeski, hockey, nordic, skiing, and snowboarding.

The school has five playing fields and two practice ones, an ice rink, six tennis courts, a thirteen-station ropes course, a mountain biking course,  of trails, and a winter sports park, including ski jumps and slopes.

Campus
 The Vermont Academy campus is located on the north side of Saxtons River, bounded on the south by Burk Hill Road and on the east by Pleasant Street. Jones Hall, now a dormitory, was its only building until 1888, when Fuller Hall, was built. In 1921, Alumni Hall was designed by the noted architect Frank Lyman Austin. In addition to the Wilbur Library, Vermont Academy has a number of buildings on campus. Dormitories are separated by gender, with space to accommodate just over 100 boys and 60 girls. In the 2000s, several new spaces on campus were created, including: the observatory (2003), the gymnasium and fitness center (2004), and a performing arts center (2006).

The Vermont Academy campus was listed on the National Register of Historic Places in 2015.

Notable alumni

Vermont Academy has educated numerous American politicians and military officers, including the diplomat John Barrett (1885), the ambassador Mark Palmer (1959), the judges Joseph Bogdanski (1931), Fred Tarbell Field (1895), and Frank L. Fish, and three members of the House of Representatives: Henry L. Bowles, Howard A. Coffin, and Samuel B. Pettengill (1904). Frank C. Archibald, the seventh Vermont Attorney General, also graduated from the school. Frank E. Putnam, who was a lawyer and served in the Minnesota Senate, graduated from the Vermont Academy.  Military officers include United States Army officers Donald E. Edwards (1955) and Bruce M. Lawlor (1966), Marine Corps officer William W. Stickney (1922), and Navy officer Joseph Metcalf III (1946).

A number of graduates have also pursued professional sports. Professional basketball players include: Bruce Brown (2016), Keron DeShields (2011), Corey Johnson (2015), Tyrique Jones (2016), Jordan Nwora (2017), Simisola Shittu (2018), and Christian Vital, who later transferred to St. Thomas More School. Brown and Nwora are the only two to have played in the National Basketball Association, with Nwora winning the 2021 NBA Finals with the Milwaukee Bucks.  Professional hockey players include Chloé Aurard (2018), Paul Fenton (1978), Lotti Odnoga (2018) and Blanka Škodová (2018), while Bill Torrey (1952) is a member of the Hockey Hall of Fame as an executive in the National Hockey League. Other notable athletes include Bert Abbey (1887) and Danny MacFayden of Major League Baseball, the skiers Rob DesLauriers (1983) and Joseph Peter Wilson, the football player Marcus Santos-Silva (2017), and Jim MacLaren (1981), a triathlete. John Henry Williams (1986), the only son of the baseball great Ted Williams, also attended the school.

Three notable founders and inventors attended Vermont Academy in the nineteenth-century, including: Paul Harris (1888), the founder of Rotary International; Russell W. Porter (1891), the founder of amateur telescope making; and Archibald Query (1900), the inventor of Marshmallow Fluff. Christopher A. Sinclair (1967), the former Chief Executive Officer of Pepsi, also graduated from the school.

The authors George Burwell Utley, Mark W. Smith (1987), John Steptoe, and Helen M. Winslow, the orthodontist Albert H. Ketcham, the scientist Florence R. Sabin (1889), and the religious figures Bishop John Bryson Chane (1963) and missionary Clara Converse (1879), who is credited with establishing education for women in Japan, all graduated from the school.

Joe Perry (1969), the lead guitarist of the noted rock band Aerosmith, graduated from Vermont Academy.

Controversies
In 2012, Vermont Academy fired a math and science teacher for possession of child pornography.  He was later sentenced to 30 years in prison.

See also
National Register of Historic Places listings in Windham County, Vermont

References

External links

Boarding schools in Vermont
Preparatory schools in Vermont
Private high schools in Vermont
Educational institutions established in 1876
Saxtons River, Vermont
Schools in Windham County, Vermont
1876 establishments in Vermont
Historic districts on the National Register of Historic Places in Vermont
National Register of Historic Places in Windham County, Vermont
Buildings and structures in Rockingham, Vermont